Johann Michael von Loën (11 December 1694 in Frankfurt am Main - 24 July 1776 in Lingen, Ems) was a German writer and statesman. His The Honest Man at Court 1748, was translated into English in 1997. He was great uncle of Goethe, born in 1749.

References

18th-century German writers
18th-century German male writers
1694 births
1776 deaths